Anaplectes is a genus of African birds in the weaver family Ploceidae.

Taxonomy
The genus Anaplectes was introduced in 1863 by the German naturalist Ludwig Reichenbach. The type species was subsequently designated by Richard Bowdler Sharpe as Ploceus leuconotus Müller, JW 1851, now a subspecies of the red-headed weaver (Anaplectes rubriceps).

The genus contains the following two species:

 Red-headed weaver	Anaplectes rubriceps
 Red weaver Anaplectes jubaensis

References

 
Ploceidae
Bird genera